Reece Hussain (born 8 December 1995) is an English cricketer. He made his first-class debut on 28 March 2017 for Oxford MCCU against Surrey as part of the Marylebone Cricket Club University fixtures. He was educated at Felsted School and Oxford Brookes University.

References

External links
 

1995 births
Living people
English cricketers
Oxford MCCU cricketers
Sportspeople from Essex
People educated at Felsted School
Alumni of Oxford Brookes University
Hertfordshire cricketers
Hussain family